The Bob Cousy Award presented by The College of the Holy Cross (or Bob Cousy Collegiate Point Guard of the Year Award) is an annual basketball award given by the Naismith Memorial Basketball Hall of Fame to the top men's collegiate point guard. It is named after six-time National Basketball Association (NBA) champion Bob Cousy, who played point guard for the Boston Celtics from 1950 to 1963. Cousy won six championships with the Celtics.

Annually, a list of players is nominated by college head coaches, members of College Sports Information Directors of America (CoSIDA), and members of the National Association of Basketball Coaches (NABC). A screening committee of CoSIDA members reviews the nominations, and selects 16 players from each division (12 from National Collegiate Athletic Association (NCAA) Division I, and two each from Division II and III). A selection committee appointed by the Hall then selects the winner. This 30-member committee is composed of Hall of Famers, head coaches, sports information directors, the media, and Cousy himself.

When Maryland's Greivis Vásquez won the award in 2010, the Venezuelan became the first player born outside the U.S. to receive this award. The University of North Carolina has fielded the greatest number of award winners (3), with Raymond Felton winning the award in 2005, Ty Lawson receiving the honor in 2009 and Kendall Marshall winning in 2012.

Winners

Winners by school

See also
Nancy Lieberman Award – the counterpart to the Bob Cousy Award; given to the nation's top NCAA female point guard.

References
General

Specific

External links

Awards established in 2004
College basketball trophies and awards in the United States